Hans Brenner (born 14 September 1912, date of death unknown) was a Swiss freestyle swimmer. He competed in the men's 400 metre freestyle at the 1936 Summer Olympics.

References

External links
 

1912 births
Year of death missing
Olympic swimmers of Switzerland
Swimmers at the 1936 Summer Olympics
Place of birth missing
Swiss male freestyle swimmers